Blast (stylized as BL'AST!) is an American punk rock band formed in 1983 in Santa Cruz, California. After breaking up in 1991, they reunited in 2001 and again in 2013. To date, Blast has released three original studio albums (the latest being 1989's Take the Manic Ride), and they have gone through several lineup changes, leaving vocalist Clifford Dinsmore and guitarist Mike Neider as the only constant members.

History
Blast released their first album, The Power of Expression, in 1986. They recorded the album three times before releasing it. They first were signed by Green World Records. Blast caught the attention of SST Records, who signed them for their next release, 1987's It's in My Blood. That same year, a 7-inch was released, including a cover of Alice Cooper's "School's Out". They also were releasing new music on Santa Cruz Skateboard videos. SST and Santa Cruz Skateboards began shared videos and merchandise bridged by Blast as Neider had worked for the skateboard company for many years. The band's third release for SST was Take the Manic Ride, released in 1989.

Blast broke up in 1991 while working on their next album. Neider and Torgerson began Blackout, releasing one 7-inch under that name, and then LAB, who put out a 7-inch EP and a four-song CD and continued into the late 1990s, playing many shows with Fu Manchu. Former Kyuss and Fu Manchu drummer Brant Bjork moved to Santa Cruz to briefly join LAB before joining up with Fu Manchu. In 2001, Blast reunited for shows on the West Coast of the United States.

On September 3, 2013, Southern Lord and Dave Grohl released a remixed and remastered version of It's in My Blood, titled Blood!. Following that release, original vocalist Clifford Dinsmore and guitarist Mike Neider recruited bassist Chuck Dukowski and drummer Dave Grohl to a new Blast EP For Those Who've Graced The Fire, which was released on Rise Records. Mike Neider and Clifford Dinsmore have recruited bassist Nick Oliveri and drummer Joey Castillo to a new Blast lineup, with plans to tour and record new material.

Discography

Studio albums
 The Power of Expression (1986)
 It's in My Blood (1987)
 Take The Manic Ride (1989)
 Blood! (2013)
 The Expression of Power (2014)

EPs and singles
 For Those Who've Graced the Fire (2015)
 BL'AST! / eyehategod split (2016)

Demos
 Whirlwind (1991)

References

External links
 

1983 establishments in California
Hardcore punk groups from California
Musical groups disestablished in 1991
Musical groups disestablished in 2001
Musical groups established in 1983
Musical groups reestablished in 2001
Musical groups reestablished in 2013
SST Records artists